The Ba'Alawi tariqa, also known as the Tariqa Alawiyya is a Sufi order centered in Hadhramawt, Yemen, but now spread across the Indian Ocean rim along with the Hadhrami diaspora. The order is closely tied to the Ba'Alawi sadah family.

It was founded by al-Faqih Muqaddam As-Sayyid Muhammad bin Ali Ba'Alawi al-Husaini, who died in the year 653 AH (1232 CE). He received his ijazah from Abu Madyan in Morocco via two of his students. Abu Madyan was a student of Shadhiliya tariqa chain of spiritual transmitters from Muhammad. The members of this Sufi way are mainly sayyids whose ancestors hail from the valley of Hadramaut, in the southern part of Yemen, although it is not limited to them.

The chain of ijazah of spiritual Sufi transmission from al-Faqih Muqaddam Sayyid Muhammad traces back to the Islamic prophet Muhammad via his cousin Ali and from him, his son Husain.

The Origin
The name Ba'Alawi itself is a Hadhrami contraction of the terms Bani 'Alawi or the Clan of 'Alawi.

In the early fourth century Hijri at 318 H, Sayyid Ahmad al-Muhaajir bin Isa ar-Rumi bin Muhammad al-Naqib bin Ali al-Uraidhi ibn Ja'far al-Sadiq migrated from Basrah, Iraq first to Mecca and Medina, and then to Hadhramout, to avoid the chaos then prevalent in the Abbasid Caliphate, where descendants of Muhammad were continuously being suspected of arson and revolt against the caliph. Most descendants of Muhammad known as sayyids enjoyed much followings due to their steep knowledge in Islam and its teachings, both esoteric and exoteric. Although such personalities may not have political ambitions, having huge followings means that they always attract the suspicions of the caliphate.

The name 'Alawi refers to the grandson of Sayyid Ahmad al-Muhajir, who was the first descendant of Husain, Muhammad's grandson, to be born in Hadramaut and the first to bear such a name.

Thus all the 'Alawi sayyids of Hadramaut are his progeny, and his descendants has since spread far and wide to the Arabian Peninsula, India especially in the Southern state of Kerala along the Malabar Coasts, North and West Coast of Africa (the Islamic Maghreb), and the countries of the Malay Archipelago (Malaysia and Indonesia) spreading Sunni Islam of the Shafii school and the Ba'Alawi Tariqah brand of Sufism.

Ba 'Alawiyya Sufi order, according to historians, is linked to Madyaniyya Sufi order. It is also influenced by Qadiriyya, all because the founder, Muhammad al-Faqih al-Muqaddam received the spiritual transmissions from them. Hadhramaut during his life was torn by constant tribal fights. al-Muqaddam advised the descendants of the Sayyid to abandon arms and wars and instead to pursue religious and moral values. As the founding father of the Sufism in Hadhramaut, he received the title of the Qutb al-Irshad wa Ghausil al-'Ibad Wa al-Bilad of the Ba 'Alawiyya Sufi order, which is the highest rank in Sufism (see also Abdal). Initially, the followers of Ba 'Alawiyya functioned secretly for about five centuries.

Doctrines
Like many other Sufi orders, Ba 'Alawi order supports the doctrine of outward (zahir) and inward (batin). The outward aspect of this tariqa consists of pursuing religious sciences and ritual practices while its inward aspect is the attainment of Sufi stations (maqamat) and states (ahwal). The virtues of the order is that its adherents never disclose their secrets (sawn al-asrar) and they preserve them from uninitiated. The outward aspect follows Al-Ghazali's practices as described in his Ihya Ulum al-Deen, while the inward aspect is similar to Shadhiliyya Sufi order.

The basic doctrine of Ba 'Alawiyya is the purification of heart through saintly life. Even Though it is a Sufism and an offshoot of Qadiriyya, but it does not have Khalwah (seclusion for purposes of spiritual exercise) and does not renounce worldly activities. It also emphasizes the teaching and practicing Akhlaq as exemplified by the Prophet Muhammad.

Imam Ahmad bin Isa al-Muhajir and his son, according to majority of historians, spread the legal school of Shafi'i and Ash'ari for theology.

R.B. Serjeant summarizes the main points of Ba 'Alawiyya tariqa: The Sayyids affirm it is the best Tariqa based on al-Qur'an and Sunnah and the beliefs of pious ancestors (al-Aslaf Shalihin), but act with humility, piety and lofty motive. The follower must love obscurity, dislike manifestation, withdraw from madding crowd, but he still has to warn and advice in matters of religious duty. He must also show kindness to his family, relatives, neighbors, friends, acquaintances, tribes and to all other Muslims.

The tradition was transmitted orally in its first generation, so no books were written. Later on, transmission through writing became more important to clarify some obscurity. Books such as al-Burqa, al-Ma'arij, al-Kibrit al-Ahmar, al-Juz al-Latif were then written to preserve the gradual disappearance of the tariqa. The tariqa also teaches the adherents to give da'wah and disseminate Islam peacefully without violence. This explains why Islam could have spread easily in South East Asian countries and was accepted by the indigenous people, where the followers brought Islam peacefully and mostly through trading and marriage (this because the men did not bring their wives abroad).

Ba 'Alawiyya followers also practice other outward-aspect traditions not taught in Ihya Ulum al-Deen. For example, it is common for the Ba 'Alawiyya followers in the past, mainly in Hadhramaut and Malay Archipelago, to perform Taqbil, especially to respected Habibs. Annual spiritual activities such as Mawlid, Khaul (anniversary commemoration of the death of a family member or to highly respected persons in the community), or practices performed routinely such as Majlis Dhikr (Dhikr assemblies, usually by reciting  or  such as Wird al-Latif or Ratib by Habib Abdullah bin Alwi al-Haddad after every Fajr and Maghrib time), Tahlil (another form of Dhikr assembly, but usually is performed if somebody dies), Reading of classical Islamic books, and Ziyarat are practices followed by Ba 'Alawiyya. During these events it is not uncommon to see Haḍras and Qasidas also recited and sometimes accompanied with Rebanas. Some of the above practices (such as mawlid or qasida) even performed in wedding ceremonies by Ba 'Alawi communities.

The influences of Ba 'Alawi tariqa can be found also in a few large Islamic organizations. For example, the rituals performed by members of Nahdlatul Ulama such as Tahlil, mawlid or ziyarat are all influenced by and can be traced back to the Ba 'Alawiyya teachings, where Hadhrami of Ba 'Alawiyya migrated and taught the tariqa in Java since the 18th century.

Some of the prominent figures of this tariqa are:
 al-Qutb al-Ghawth al-Imam Muhammad al-Faqih al-Muqaddam
 al-Habib Qutb Abu Bakr al-Aydarus al-'Adeni
 The Wali Qutb al-Ghawth al-Habib Abdullah ibn Alawi al-Haddad
 The Wali Qutb al-Ghawth Al-habib Umar ibn Ahmad ibn Abubakar ibn Sumayt
 The Wali Qutb al-Ghawth Alhabib Ali ibn Muhammad Al-Habshi
 The Wali Qutb Sawahili al-Ghawth Al-habib Swaleh ibn Alwy ibn Abdallah Jamal al-Layl
 al-Habib Ahmad bin Zayn al-Habshi
 Sayyid Muhammad Alawi al-Maliki
 Habib Umar bin Hafiz
 Habib Ali al-Jifri
In Hadhramaut, the teaching of this tariqa is done in several Ribath, such as Ribath Tarim or at Dar al-Mustafa founded by Habib Umar bin Hafiz.

See also

 List of Sufi orders
 Habib Salih
 Ba 'Alawi sada

References

Footnotes

Bibliography
 Dostal, Walter, Saints of Hadramawt. In Walter Dostal and Wolfgang Kraus, editors, Shattering Tradition: Custom, Law and the Individual in the Muslim Mediterranean, 233–253. New York: I.B. Tauris, 2005
 Ba'alawi.com Ba'alawi.com | The Definitive Resource for Islam and the Alawiyyen Ancestry

External links
 Ba'alawi.com Ba'alawi.com | The Definitive Resource for Islam and the Alawiyyen Ancestry
 The Ba'Alawi of Hadramaut

Sunni Sufi orders
Sufism